Ogoulou is a department of Ngounié Province in southern Gabon. The capital lies at Mimongo. It had a population of 8,361 in 2013.

Towns and villages

References

Ngounié Province
Departments of Gabon